The 1959 USAC Road Racing Championship season was the second season of the USAC Road Racing Championship.  It began March 8, 1959, and ended October 18, 1959, after eleven races.  The series was contested for sports cars at eight rounds, and Formula Libre at three rounds.  Augie Pabst won the season championship.

Calendar

Season results

References

External links
World Sports Racing Prototypes: 1959 USAC Road Racing Championship
Racing Sports Cars: USAC Road Racing Championship archive

USAC Road Racing Championship
Usac Road Racing
1959 in American motorsport